MS Jan Heweliusz was a Norwegian-built Polish ferry named after astronomer Johannes Hevelius that served on the route Ystad–Świnoujście. It was built in Norway in 1977 and was owned by Polish Ocean Lines and operated by its subsidiary company Euroafrica Shipping Lines. In the early hours of 14 January 1993 it capsized and sank in 27 metres of water off Cape Arcona on the coast of Rügen in the Baltic Sea while sailing toward Ystad with 64 passengers and crew. The accident claimed the lives of 20 crewmen and 35 passengers. Ten bodies were never found. Nine people were rescued. The sinking of Jan Heweliusz is the most deadly peacetime maritime disaster involving a Polish ship.

1986 fire 
In September 1986 the ship suffered a serious fire. No one on board was injured, but the ship was heavily damaged. The ship was repaired by coating the damaged areas with 60 tons of concrete, which increased the weight of the ship and dangerously affected its stability; this was apparently an illegal method.

1993 sinking 
It capsized at 05:12. The waves were up to 6 metres high and ferries in the nearby port of Sassnitz had been cancelled. Prior to its sinking, Jan Heweliusz had been involved in 28 incidents, including collisions with fishing boats, listing, engine failure and the aforementioned fire in 1986. It had ballast problems and had also damaged its hull in Ystad during docking, but this was not reported to the port authorities and only makeshift repairs were made. It sailed two hours late, carrying 10 railway carriages from five European countries.

The Marine Chamber of Appeals in Gdynia blamed the accident on the poor technical condition of the ship, with the captain, who died in the accident, also being blamed for allowing the ship to sail in such an unseaworthy state.

In 2005 the European Court of Human Rights in Strasburg ruled that the official investigation of the sinking was not impartial and granted €4,600 in damages each to eleven relatives of the victims.

The wreck of the ship is located at a depth of 27 metres and is frequently visited by divers.

See also

List of disasters in Poland by death toll
List of roll-on/roll-off vessel accidents
ORP Heweliusz

References

External links
Underwater pictures of the Jan Heweliusz wreck
 Björkman, Anders (2007). Estonia revisited +Learning from the often forgotten Jan Heweliusz disaster

Ships built in Norway
Ferries of Poland
Shipwrecks in the Baltic Sea
Maritime incidents in 1993
Maritime incidents in 1986
1977 ships
1986 in Poland
1993 in Poland
January 1993 events in Europe
September 1986 events in Europe